The Pitcairn Islands, a group of islands in the southern Pacific Ocean, are the last remaining British Overseas Territory in Oceania. When Fiji became independent in 1970, Pitcairn Island was placed under the authority of the British high commissioner (ambassador) to New Zealand. In practice, partly due to its isolation, Pitcairn has effectively had internal self-government throughout this period. From 1790 to 1829, the local head of government was known simply as the leader. They had a president from 1832 to 1838, and a magistrate from that time until 1999, except for an eleven-year gap from 1893 to 1904, when the chief official was the president of the Council. In 1999, the magistrate's non-judicial functions were transferred to the new office of mayor.

Local heads of government (1790–present)

Colonial governors (1898–present)

See separate articles:

Governors of Fiji (1898–1970)
British High Commissioners to New Zealand (1970–present)

See also

List of current heads of government in the United Kingdom and dependencies
History of the Pitcairn Islands

References

Pitcairn Island
Government of the Pitcairn Islands
Pitcairn Islands politicians
Pitcairn Islands-related lists
1790 establishments in the Pitcairn Islands